Budling  (Lorraine Franconian: Bidléngen) is a commune in the Moselle department in Grand Est, northeastern France.

Population

See also
 Communes of the Moselle department

References

External links
 

Communes of Moselle (department)